The Swaziland National Union of Students is a membership-based organisation of students in all higher institutions of learning in Swaziland. It seeks to create a student movement and geared to confront the socio economic and political challenges of the country. The organisation also advocates an education policy that is informed by the economic demands faced by the country and the democratisation of Swazi society.  

The Union's President, Brian Sangweni, was elected in 25 February 2017.

References

External links
Official site
Facebook site
Interview with former SNUS president Maxwell Dlamini

Education in Eswatini
Student organisations based in Eswatini
Students' unions